Iodidimonas is a genus of bacteria.

References

Caulobacterales
Bacteria genera